Newland is a village and civil parish on the north-eastern edge of Malvern Link, Worcestershire, England, on the A449 road.

The village lies on the edge of the 6.5 hectare Newland Common, which is protected by the Malvern Hills Conservators and is centred on the traditional English Swan Inn public house.  Adjacent to the Swan is a cricket field run as part of Barnards Green Cricket Club. Both the Swan and the cricket field are owned by the Trustees of the Madresfield Estate - a large local landowner. There is no shop or post office in the village.

The population of the parish was 310 in 2011.

Churches and history

The first church at Newland was St Michael's, dating from c1215 and rebuilt in the fifteenth century.  It was demolished in 1865.

The St Leonard Chapelry, in Newland is associated with the Beauchamp Community of retired Church of England priests. It was built alongside almshouses on land given by Frederick Lygon, 6th Earl Beauchamp  to set up a community based on Anglo-Catholic principles.  Originally the almshouses provided homes for retired workers from the Madresfield Estate and for the poor of the parish and now house practising Anglicans and retired clergy from across the country. The chair of trustees is Lady Rosalind Morrison, grand daughter of the 7th Earl Beauchamp and heiress of Madresfield.

Transport

Rail
Rail  services are provided from Malvern Link railway station located in  Worcester Road about one mile away, with direct services to Worcester, Hereford, Birmingham, Oxford and London.

Alongside the Hereford to Worcester railway line to the north of the village is a former halt,  with  a signal box and level  crossing. This is now a showman site of mobile homes where showpeople live and store their rides, amusements and trade equipment.

Bus
Several local bus services connect Newland with the surrounding area  with other routes serving  areas further afield including the  Malvern to  Worcester route 44, 44A, 44B operated by First Diamond serving stops  in  Malvern Link, Link Top, Great Malvern, and  Barnards Green.

Air
The nearest major airport is Birmingham approximately one hour by road via the M5 and M42 motorways. Gloucestershire Airport located at Staverton, in the Borough of Tewkesbury near Malvern is a busy General Aviation airport used mainly for private charter and scheduled flights to destinations such as the islands of Jersey, Guernsey, and the Isle of Man, pilot training, and by the aircraft of emergency services.

References

External links

 Beauchamp Community
 Church parish of Newland

Villages in Worcestershire
Civil parishes in Worcestershire